Zu ol Faqr Rural District is a rural district (dehestan) in Sarshiv District, Saqqez County, Kurdistan Province, Iran. At the 2006 census, its population was 7,715, in 1,497 families. The rural district has 35 villages.

References 

Rural Districts of Kurdistan Province
Saqqez County